A section is a military sub-subunit. It usually consists of between 6 and 20 personnel. NATO and U.S. doctrine define a section as an organization "larger than a squad, but smaller than a platoon." As such, two or more sections usually make up an army platoon or an air force flight.

Land forces

NATO

Standard NATO symbol for a section consists of two dots (●●) placed above a framed unit icon.

Australian Army
At the start of World War I, the Australian Army used a section that consisted of 27 men including the section commander, a sergeant.

During World War II, a rifle section comprised ten soldiers with a corporal in command and a lance-corporal as his second-in-command. The corporal used an M1928 Thompson submachine gun, while one of the privates used a Bren gun. The other eight soldiers all used No.1 Mk.3 Lee–Enfield rifles with a bayonet and scabbard. They all carried two or three No.36 Mills bomb grenades.

After World War II, and during the Vietnam War, a rifle section consisted of ten personnel comprising a command and scout group (three people – two sub-machineguns/M16A1 and a L1A1 SLR); a gun group (three people – an M60 machine gun and two L1A1 SLRs) and a rifle group (four people – L1A1 SLRs). The section was later reduced to nine men, and consisted of the section commander, a two-man scout group, the section 2IC and two other men in the gun group, and a three-man rifle group; the section commander would usually move with the latter.

Under the new structure of the infantry platoon, Australian Army sections are made up of eight men divided into two four-man fireteams. Each fireteam consists of a team leader (corporal/lance-corporal), a marksman with enhanced optics, a grenadier with an M203 grenade launcher and an LSW operator with an  F89 Minimi light support weapon.

Typical fire team structure:

British Military
A British Army section is equivalent to a NATO squad, and the British Army has no organization equivalent to a NATO section.

British Army (World War II and the Cold War)

The rifle section of a World War II infantry battalion was generally formed of a corporal as the section commander, a Lance corporal as the section 2IC from April 1943 onwards, and a varying number of privates depending on the year of the war. The corporal variously carried a Lee-Enfield rifle, a Thompson machine carbine, or a Sten machine carbine depending on the year of the war, one private would be the section gunner with a Bren light machine gun, and all other section members were armed with Lee–Enfield rifles (though the corporal might swap his machine carbine with another member of the section). At the onset of hostilities in 1939, the section consisted of the section commander, one Bren gunner and his assistant, and five riflemen for a total of eight men; in 1940, this was increased to ten men. A typical section as of 1944 was divided into a rifle group consisting of the section commander and six riflemen, and a gun group consisting of the section 2IC and gun controller, the section gunner or Bren No. 1, and the Bren No. 2 carrying a spare barrel for the Bren gun; the six riflemen each carried two Bren magazines and a bandolier with a further fifty rounds, the Bren No. 2 carried five magazines, and the other two members of the gun group carried four magazines for a total of a thousand rounds of ammunition for the Bren. Three sections together formed a platoon, with two being forward sections and the third being a reserve.

The 1950s initially had no meaningful changes to the infantry section and its armament save for the rifle group gaining a seventh man, but later saw the replacement of .303in weapons with new models chambered for 7.62mm NATO, as well as a shift from the magazine-fed Bren to the belt-fed L7A1 (later L7A2) general purpose machine gun (GPMG). Most battalions reverted to a ten-man section organisation, with the rifle group now consisting of the section commander (corporal) with an L1A1 Self-Loading Rifle (SLR) and six riflemen with L1A1 SLRs, while the gun group consisted of the section 2IC and gun controller (Lance corporal) with an SLR, the section gunner or GPMG No. 1 with the GPMG, and the GPMG No. 2 with an SLR and a spare GPMG barrel. A certain amount of 7.62mm linked ammunition was carried by all members of the section (200 rounds per gun group member, 50 rounds per rifle group member), with ammunition held by the rifle group being redistributed to the gun group prior to an assault. In a mechanised battalion, the section nominally consisted of ten men as well, but two of these were detailed as vehicle crewmen, thus giving a dismounted strength of eight men. As a result of this, a mechanised section's rifle group only had four riflemen; two of these could be detailed as a Medium Anti-tank Weapon (MAW) No. 1 with an L14A1 84mm anti-tank weapon and a MAW No. 2 with additional 84mm rounds but otherwise continued to act as riflemen (in other battalions, the MAW No. 1 and No 2 were normally part of the platoon headquarters). Rifle-launched No. 95 anti-tank grenades that had been used with the Lee-Enfield rifle continued to be made available for anti-armour defence in lieu of or in addition to the L14A1, with these later being replaced by shoulder-fired L1 66mm HEAT rockets. There also were a number of M79 40mm grenade launchers available.

Tactical doctrine stated that, where casualties were sustained, a section could only be reduced to one NCO and five other ranks before bayonet power in the assault or the ability to organise a proper system of double sentries at night time were fatally compromised. Later sections would all consist of eight men (as well as any men detailed as vehicle crew) regardless of the battalion type; this reorganisation also saw the rifle group being modified to consist of the section commander with an SLR and four riflemen with SLRs and 66mm HEAT rockets. In the event of a significant armour threat, two riflemen would be re-roled as a MAW No. 1 with an L14A1 84mm anti-tank gun and either a 9mm L2A3 9mm submachine gun or an SLR and a MAW No. 2 with an SLR and additional 84mm ammunition. No changes were made to the gun group.

Both World War II and Cold War section tactics were designed with a view to bringing the section machine gun to bear on the enemy and providing support to it; once the gun group had suppressed the enemy ("winning the firefight"), the rifle group would assault and destroy the enemy position with the gun group providing fire until the last safe moment.

British Army (Late and Post–Cold War)
The introduction of the 5.56mm select-fire SA80 series (L85 rifle or individual weapon and L86 light support weapon) to replace 7.62mm weapons and the L2A3 submachine gun and of the LAW 80 to replace the L14A1 gun and the L1A3 66mm rockets from the mid-to-late 1980s onwards led to the rifle group/gun group organisation being abandoned in favour of fireteam groupings, with this being given doctrinal definition by 1986; however, sections organised according to the earlier rifle group/gun group model would still be in existence until at least 1988, with changes in such sections mostly being limited to earlier weapons being replaced by their newer equivalents. The British section continued to consist of eight soldiers, but under normal circumstances these were now divided into a Charlie and Delta fireteam with each team comprising an NCO and three other men. The platoon continued, and continues, to be composed of three sections.

The normal section organisation during the late 1980s, the 1990s, and the early 2000s was as follows:
Charlie Fireteam
Section Commander/Charlie Commander (Corporal) armed with an L85A1 5.56mm rifle (Upgraded to L85A2 from 2002 to 2006)
Two Riflemen armed with L85A1 5.56mm rifles (Upgraded to L85A2 from 2002 to 2006)
Gunner armed with an L86A1 5.56mm light support weapon (Upgraded to L86A2 from 2002 to 2006; often replaced informally by the earlier L7A2 7.62mm general purpose machine gun owing to the L86's shortcomings in the section machine gun role, and later officially replaced by the L110A1 5.56mm light machine gun)
Delta Fireteam
Section 2IC/Delta Commander (Lance Corporal) armed with an L85A1 5.56mm rifle (Upgraded to L85A2 from 2002 to 2006)
Two Riflemen armed with L85A1 5.56mm rifles (Upgraded to L85A2 from 2002 to 2006)
Gunner armed with an L86A1 5.56mm light support weapon (Upgraded to L86A2 from 2002 to 2006; often replaced informally by the earlier L7A2 7.62mm general purpose machine gun owing to the L86's shortcomings in the section machine gun role, and later officially replaced by the L110A1 5.56mm light machine gun)

This grouping provided a balanced organisation, with either fireteam being capable of moving to assault or supporting the other fireteam's movement (though doctrine still had the Lance Corporal's fireteam providing covering fire in the initial stages of a section attack). The fireteam concept was intended to introduce an element of flexibility, and consequently two other section groupings were devised; an assault team/support team grouping where the Delta fireteam (consisting of the section 2IC, a rifleman, and both section gunners) was responsible for covering the Charlie fireteam (consisting of the section commander and three riflemen, though this could be raised to four if the rifleman in the Delta fireteam was moved to the Charlie fireteam) during the latter's movement from one position to another, and a modified version of the earlier rifle group/gun group organisation, used if it was felt that the strongest possible manoeuvre force was required, where both section gunners formed the gun group and all remaining personnel formed the Charlie fireteam which acted as the rifle group. There were also groupings devised in relation to specific combat scenarios; sections engaged in trench clearing could either be organised as usual or be split into four assault teams of two men each, while sections tasked with clearing a house were organised into a command group, a covering group comprising both section gunners (and possibly the section 2IC), and two assault groups of two riflemen each.

Fireteams could also be split into smaller sub-divisions of two men each outside of these groupings, particularly during fire and manoeuvre. Two LAW 80 launchers (designated as the L1A1 94mm HEAT rocket system and henceforth referred to as LAWs) were part of the standard equipment allocation for each section and were carried as needed; the normal section grouping had one LAW per fireteam, while the assault team/support team grouping could have a LAW carried by one or both teams depending on the perceived armour threat. It was also possible to have the platoon's reserve section equipped with all six LAWs, leaving the two forward sections unencumbered for fire and manoeuvre and providing them with anti-armour defence. In April 1998 the Rifle Grenade General Service was introduced into service; issue was scaled at twelve L85A1 HE rifle grenades and six L15A1 rifle grenade launcher sights per section, effectively allowing all rifle-equipped members of the section to carry and use two rifle grenades each.

Not all sections consisted of eight men; units mounted aboard the FV510 Warrior infantry fighting vehicle consisted of seven men, with one fireteam's second rifleman usually being the section member that was omitted. While the FV432 armoured personnel carrier can accommodate a section consisting of ten men, this is in relation to the earlier Cold War section organisation, with sections organised according to the later and post-Cold War organisation remaining at eight men.

Changes were made to the section's equipment during the 2000s in response to operational demands and experience; the L85A1 rifle was upgraded to L85A2 standard between 2002 and 2006, with a further upgrade package consisting of a Picatinny rail handguard and alternative optical sights being introduced for select units in 2007 and more generally from 2009 onwards, the L123 40mm underslung grenade launcher (UGL) was introduced as a replacement for the L85A1 HE rifle grenade, the L86 light support weapon was replaced as the section machine gun by the L110A1-A3 5.56mm light machine gun acquired as an Urgent Operational Requirement, and the second rifleman in the fireteam was re-roled as a designated marksman carrying either the L86A2 light support weapon or, in later years, the L129A1 7.62mm sharpshooter rifle. By 2005 therefore, the normal section grouping was reorganised as follows:
Charlie Fireteam
Section Commander/Charlie Commander (Corporal) armed with an L85A2 5.56mm rifle
Rifleman armed with an L85A2 5.56mm rifle and L123A1-A3 40mm UGL (though this could be carried by the fireteam commander instead)
Gunner armed with an L110A1-A3 5.56mm light machine gun
Designated marksman armed with an L86A2 5.56mm light support weapon (Supplemented and then largely replaced by L129A1 7.62mm sharpshooter rifle from 2010 onwards)
Delta Fireteam
Section 2IC/Delta Commander (Lance Corporal) armed with an L85A2 5.56mm rifle
Rifleman armed with an L85A2 5.56mm rifle and L123A1-A3 40mm UGL (though this could be carried by the fireteam commander instead)
Gunner armed with an L110A1-A3 5.56mm light machine gun
Designated marksman armed with an L86A2 5.56mm light support weapon (Supplemented and then largely replaced by L129A1 7.62mm sharpshooter rifle from 2010 onwards)

The two other section groupings were also modified; the assault team/support team grouping now had the Charlie fireteam consist of the section commander, a rifleman with UGL, and both section gunners, with the Delta fireteam consisting of the section 2IC, both section marksmen, and a rifleman with UGL. The rifle group/gun group organisation was replaced by a fast assault/fire support grouping where the Charlie fireteam consisted of the section commander with UGL and a rifleman, while all remaining personnel formed the Delta fireteam. Trench clearing and house clearing groupings remained unchanged. Some units operating in Afghanistan carried on using the L7A2 GPMG as the section machine gun or included it as an additional weapon on the scale of one per fireteam; in the case of the latter, this meant that only two L85A2s (at least one of which was fitted with the UGL) were carried per section. The 84mm AT-4 (L1A2 or L2A1) and then the 150mm NLAW replaced the L1A1 94mm HEAT rocket as the section anti-armour weapon, though carrying arrangements were essentially unchanged; the Javelin can also be carried for anti-armour capability. The L128A1 12 bore combat shotgun was introduced for use by the section point man, with this position subject to rotation within the section to avoid excessive stress for individual soldiers.

The L85A2 began being upgraded to L85A3 standard from 2018 onwards, while the L86A2 and L110A3 began to be removed from service in 2019, leaving the L129A1 and L7A2 as the standard section designated marksman rifle and standard section machine gun respectively. With section commanders now also being able to tailor equipment formations as needed instead of having to deploy in a pre-set lineup, the current British infantry section is as follows:
Section Commander/Charlie Fireteam Commander (Corporal) armed with an L85A2/A3 5.56 mm rifle
Section 2IC/Delta Fireteam Commander (Lance Corporal) armed with an L85A2/A3 5.56 mm rifle
Four Riflemen (Privates) armed with L85A2/A3 5.56 mm rifles, two of which will normally be equipped with an L123A3 40 mm UGL.
Gunner (Private) armed with an L7A2 7.62 mm general purpose machine gun (at the section commander's discretion, the gunner can be re-designated as an additional rifleman with an L85A2/A3 5.56 mm rifle)
Designated marksman (Private) armed with an L129A1 7.62 mm sharpshooter rifle

Cadet Forces

The Army Cadet Force and the Army Sections of the Combined Cadet Force also make use of infantry sections; these are equipped similarly to their British Army counterparts (though with explosives limited to smoke grenades and hand-fired rocket flares, and with substituted small arms – the L1A1 rifle and L7A2 machine gun did not replace the Lee-Enfield No. 4 rifle and Bren light machine gun, while the L85 rifle was initially substituted by the straight-pull L98A1 and then the semi-automatic L98A2 which replaced the L98A1 from 2009 onwards) and, until 2018, used the following section groupings:
Normal section grouping (Until 1990)
Rifle group
Section Commander (Corporal) armed with a No. 4 .303 rifle (Partially and then completely substituted by the L98A1 5.56mm cadet GP rifle in the late 1980s and the 1990s)
Five Riflemen armed with No. 4 .303 rifles (Partially and then completely substituted by L98A1 5.56mm cadet GP rifles in the late 1980s and the 1990s)
Gun group
Section 2IC (Lance Corporal) armed with a No. 4 .303 rifle (Partially and then completely substituted by the L98A1 5.56mm cadet GP rifle in the late 1980s and the 1990s)
Gunner armed with a Bren .303 light machine gun
Normal section grouping (1990 onwards)
Charlie Fireteam
Section Commander/Charlie Commander (Corporal) armed with an L98A1/A2 5.56mm cadet GP rifle
Two Riflemen armed with L98A1/A2 5.56mm cadet GP rifles
Gunner armed with an L86A1/A2 5.56mm light support weapon
Delta Fireteam
Section 2IC/Delta Commander (Lance Corporal) armed with an L98A1/A2 5.56mm cadet GP rifle
Two Riflemen armed with L98A1/A2 5.56mm cadet GP rifles
Gunner armed with an L86A1/A2 5.56mm light support weapon
Assault team/Support team grouping (2013 onwards)
Charlie Fireteam (Assault team)
Section Commander/Charlie Commander (Corporal) armed with an L98A2 5.56mm cadet GP rifle
Three Riflemen armed with L98A2 5.56mm cadet GP rifles
Delta Fireteam (Support team)
Section 2IC/Delta Commander (Lance Corporal) armed with an L98A2 5.56mm cadet GP rifle
Two Gunners armed with L86A2 5.56mm light support weapons
Rifleman armed with an L98A2 5.56mm cadet GP rifle
Fast assault/Fire support grouping (2013 onwards)
Charlie Fireteam (Fast assault)
Section Commander/Charlie Commander (Corporal) armed with an L98A2 5.56mm cadet GP rifle
Rifleman armed with an L98A2 5.56mm cadet GP rifle
Delta Fireteam (Fire support)
Section 2IC/Delta Commander (Lance Corporal) armed with an L98A2 5.56mm cadet GP rifle
Three Riflemen armed with L98A2 5.56mm cadet GP rifles
Two Gunners armed with L86A2 5.56mm light support weapons

L86A2s in Cadet Forces use began to be withdrawn from service at the same time as those held by the British Armed Forces, with no direct replacement for the weapon being identified; as such, all members of a Army Cadet Force or Combined Cadet Force section are currently riflemen armed with L98A2s.

Canadian Army

The Canadian Army also uses the section, which is roughly the same as its British counterpart, except that it is led by a sergeant, with a master corporal as the 2IC. The section is further divided into two assault groups of four soldiers each (equivalent to the Australian and British fireteams) and a vehicle group consisting of a driver and a gunner. Assault groups are broken down to even smaller 'fireteams' consisting of two soldiers, designated Alpha, Bravo, Charlie and Delta. Alpha and Bravo make up Assault Group 1; Charlie and Delta make up Assault Group 2. The section commander will have overall control of the section, and is assigned to Fireteam Alpha of Assault Group 1. The 2IC will be in command of Assault Group 2, and is assigned to Fireteam Charlie.

Groupings are as follows:
Assault Group 1
Fireteam Alpha
Section Commander armed with a C7 rifle.
LMG Gunner armed with a C9 light machine gun.
Fireteam Bravo
Rifleman armed with a C7 rifle.
Grenadier armed with a C7 rifle and an underslung M203 grenade launcher.
Assault Group 2
Fireteam Charlie
Section 2IC armed with a C7 rifle.
LMG Gunner armed with a C9 light machine gun.
Fireteam Delta
Rifleman armed with a C7 rifle.
Grenadier armed with a C7 rifle and an underslung M203 grenade launcher.
Vehicle Group
Driver armed with a C8 carbine.
Vehicle Gunner armed with a C8 carbine.

In a mechanised section, the vehicle group gains a commander and stays with the section vehicle (Currently the LAV VI), while the second assault group loses its rifleman

Danish Army
In the Danish Army, the section consists of two squads, usually commanded by a Sergeant First Class. Sections are usually highly specialized support units providing heavy weapons support, EOD support etc.

Finnish Army
A Finnish infantry section or ryhmä consists of one section commander or ryhmänjohtaja, one section 2IC or ryhmänvarajohtaja, and six or seven other soldiers.

The standard section organisation, a "half-section" (puoliryhmä) model, is as follows:
First half-section
Section Commander armed with a 7.62 RK 62 series rifle.
First fire-and-manoeuvre team (Taistelijapari)
Machine gunner armed with a 7.62 KK PKM general purpose machine gun.
Rifleman armed with a 7.62 RK 62 series rifle.
Second half-section
Second fire-and-manoeuvre team
Two riflemen armed with 7.62 RK 62 series rifles and 66 KES anti-tank weapons
Third fire-and-manoeuvre team
Rifleman armed with a 7.62 RK 62 series rifle.
Section 2IC armed with a 7.62 RK 62 series rifle.
Driver armed with a 7.62 RK 62 series rifle.

The section can also be divided into three equally sized fireteams, with organisation being as follows:
Section commander's fireteam (Ryhmänjohtajan partio)
Fireteam leader (Section Commander) armed with a 7.62 RK 62 series rifle.
Combat lifesaver armed with a 7.62 RK 62 series rifle.
Designated marksman armed with a 7.62 RK 62 series rifle with enhanced optics.
Point fireteam (Kärkipartio)
Fireteam leader (Section 2IC) armed with a 7.62 RK 62 series rifle.
Machine gunner armed with a 7.62 KK PKM general purpose machine gun.
Rifleman armed with a 7.62 RK 62 series rifle and a 66 KES anti-tank weapon
Support fireteam (Tukipartio)
Fireteam leader (To be appointed by the section commander) armed with a 7.62 RK 62 series rifle.
Machine gunner armed with a 7.62 KK PKM general purpose machine gun.
Engineer armed with a 7.62 RK 62 series rifle.

French Army
In the French Army, the word section describes an organization equivalent to an English-language platoon and is a subunit of a company, in most military contexts. (In cavalry or armoured units, a subunit of a company is a peloton [platoon].)

The equivalent organization to a NATO section is a groupe de combat ("combat group"), which is divided into:
 a "300 metre fireteam" armed with HK 416 5.56 mm assault rifles and carrying an AT4 anti-tank weapon and
 a "600 metre fireteam", armed with a FN Minimi, a HK 416 and a personal grenade launcher.

German Army

Bundeswehr
The equivalent to section is the Gruppe, a sub-unit of 8 to 12 soldiers, in the German Bundeswehr, Austrian Bundesheer and Swiss Army.

Wehrmacht

During World War II the German Wehrmacht infantry Gruppe was mainly a general purpose machine gun (GPMG) based unit. The advantage of the GPMG concept was that it added greatly to the overall volume of fire that could be put out by a squad-sized unit. The MG 34 or MG 42 GPMGs were normally used in the LMG (light machine gun) role. An infantry Gruppe consisted of generally nine or ten men; a non-commissioned officer (Unteroffizier) squad leader, deputy squad leader, a two-man machine gun element (machine gunner and assistant gunner) and four to six riflemen.

As personal small arms the squad leader was issued a rifle (as of around 1941 a submachine gun such as the MP 40), the machine gunner and his assistant were issued pistols and the deputy squad leader and the riflemen were issued rifles. The riflemen carried additional ammunition, hand grenades, explosive charges or a machine gun tripod as required. The riflemen would provide security and covering fire for the machine gun element. Two of the standard issue bolt-action Karabiner 98k rifles in the squad could be replaced with semi-automatic Gewehr 43 rifles and occasionally, StG-44 "assault" rifles could be used to re-arm the whole squad, besides the machine-gun.

Irish Army
In the Irish Army, the infantry section consists of one Corporal or Ceannaire as section commander and eight other ranks. Section armament consists of eight Steyr AUG A1 rifles (including versions reconfigured to Mod 14 standard with a Picatinny rail and an ACOG 4x magnification optical sight), with two of these being equipped with an M203 grenade launcher, and one FN MAG 58 general purpose machine gun; two soldiers are additionally armed with AT4 short range anti-armour weapons (SRAAW) for anti-armour defence, while Heckler & Koch USP pistols are available for distribution at the platoon level. Three sections together with a headquarters element form a platoon.

Singapore Army
Singapore Army's infantry section consists of seven men led by a Third Sergeant and assisted by a Corporal or Corporal First Class as 2IC. Each section is divided into one 3-man group – including the section commander, and two 2-man groups. Weapons carried by each section include two light anti-tank weapons, two section automatic weapons (SAW), and two M203 grenade launchers.

South African Army
In the South African Army Infantry Formation (which is responsible for all South African Army infantry), the standard infantry section is divided into a seven-man rifle group and a three-man machine gun group as per the earlier British model; the rifle group consists of a section commander (Corporal) and six riflemen, all armed with R4 5.56mm rifles, while the gun group consists of a section 2IC (Lance Corporal) with a R4 5.56mm rifle, a Machine Gun No. 1 with an FN MAG 7.62mm general purpose machine gun, SS-77 7.62mm general purpose machine gun, or Mini-SS 5.56mm light machine gun, and a Machine Gun No. 2 with a R4 5.56mm rifle. In a mechanised infantry section, the rifle group is reduced to five men for a total of eight men in the section.

United States Army

Historically, a section of US Infantry was a "half platoon" (the platoon itself being a "half company"). The section was led by a sergeant assisted by one or (later) two corporals and consisted of a total of from 12–24 soldiers, depending on the time period. In the US Cavalry, a section was roughly equivalent to a squad in the US Infantry. In Armor, Armored Cavalry, Mechanized Infantry, and Stryker Infantry units, a section consists of two tanks/armored vehicles, with two sections to a platoon. The platoon leader leads one section and the platoon sergeant leads the other. Some branches, such as Air Defense Artillery and Field Artillery, use the term section to denote a squad-sized unit that may act independently of each other in the larger platoon formation. (I.e., the Firing Platoon consists of several gun sections, which are the basic firing elements of the unit.) The section is used as an administrative formation and may be bigger than the regular squad formation often overseen by a Staff Sergeant.

United States Marine Corps
The USMC employs sections as intermediate tactical echelons in infantry, armored vehicle units (individual vehicles being the base tactical element), and low altitude air defense (LAAD) units, and as the base tactical element in artillery units. Infantry sections can consist of as few as eight Marines (heavy machinegun section) to as many as 32 in an 81-mm mortar section. In headquarters, service, and support units throughout the USMC (CE, GCE, ACE, and LCE), sections are used as functional sub-units of headquarters or platoons. For example, the intelligence section (S-2) of a battalion or squadron headquarters; the communications-electronics maintenance section, communication platoon, regimental headquarters company; armory section, Marine aviation logistics squadron. In Marine aircraft squadrons, section is also used to designate a flight of two or three aircraft under the command of a designated section leader. Some sections, such as weapons platoon sections are led by a staff non-commissioned Officer (SNCO), usually a staff sergeant. Tank and other armored vehicle sections, as well as service and support sections, may be led by either an officer, usually a lieutenant (or a CWO, in the case of service and support units), or a SNCO ranging from staff sergeant to master sergeant. Headquarters and aircraft sections are always led by a commissioned officer. Rifle squads generally contain 13 marines.
 
In infantry units, weapons platoons have sections consisting of the squads and teams that man the crew-served weapons.

Weapons platoon, rifle company:
a machine gun section, consisting of a section leader and three machine gun squads, each containing two machine gun teams of three men each
an LWCMS mortar section, consisting of a section leader and three 60mm mortar squads, each containing one mortar and four man crew
an assault section, consisting of a section leader and three assault squads, each containing two assault teams of two men each

Weapons company, infantry battalion:
an 81mm mortar platoon, consisting of a five-man platoon headquarters and two 81mm mortar sections, each section containing four 81mm mortar squads of six men each and an eight-man section headquarters.
an antiarmor platoon, consisting of a three-man platoon headquarters and a Javelin section, containing a section leader and two Javelin squads, each having two teams of two men each, and an antitank (TOW) section, containing a section leader and four antitank squads, each having a squad leader and two TOW teams of two men each
a heavy machine gun (HMG) platoon, consisting of a four-man platoon headquarters and three HMG sections, each having two HMG squads of four men each.

In armored vehicle units, platoons consist of sections consisting of individual vehicles and their crews:
 tank and light armored reconnaissance platoons consist of two sections, each containing two tanks/light armored vehicles and crews
 assault amphibian vehicle (AAV) platoons consist of four sections, each containing three AAV's and crews
 combat engineer assault breacher sections consist of two CEV assault breacher vehicles and crews

In low altitude air defense (LAAD) batteries, the firing platoons consist of three sections, each consisting of a section leader and five two-man Stinger missile teams.

In artillery batteries, the firing platoon consists of a platoon headquarters and six artillery sections, each containing a section chief (staff sergeant) eight-member gun crew with one howitzer, and a driver and prime mover (i.e., a truck to tow the artillery piece and transport the gun crew and baggage). The gun crew consists of a gunner (sergeant), two assistant gunners (corporals), and five cannoneers (lance corporals and/or PFCs).

Air forces

In some air forces, a section is a unit containing three to four aircraft (if it is a flying unit) and up to 20 personnel. Two or three sections usually make up a flight.

The United States Air Force uses the term element,  as well as section, to designate two or three subunits within a flight.

In the context of British Empire military aviation during World War I, the term half flight or half-flight was used for equivalent formations; at the time a flight was normally four to six aircraft. Hence the Mesopotamian Half Flight, the first Australian flying unit to see action, initially comprised three aircraft.  After the war, the Royal Air Force and other Commonwealth air forces adopted the term section for a formation of three aircraft, while a flight was normally six aircraft. The Royal Air Force Regiment, the ground-based component of the Royal Air Force, currently employs a section structure similar to that of the British Army.

During the Second World War:
 in the German Luftwaffe, the equivalent in fighter units was a Schwarm of four aircraft and, in bomber units,  a Kette (three aircraft), along with headquarters and support personnel, and;
 the Soviet Red Air Force the equivalent was a zveno (three or four aircraft).

Other organisations
A section is also the name for a shift or team of police officers in various police forces, particularly in the Commonwealth. The term is no longer used in the British police, in which it originated and where it was the group of officers headed by a Sergeant.

See also
Infantry Minor Tactics
Contubernium (Roman army unit)

Notes

References

External links
canadiansoldiers.com article on the history of the Infantry Section.

Military units and formations by size